Before 1942, the VR Class Vr1 were originally classified as L1. The Vr1 was a powerful and effective locomotive. Part of them were built by Tampella and part by Hannoversche Maschinenbau AG of Germany. They were numbered 530–544, 656–670, 787–799  and were nicknamed “Kana” ("Hen"). They were operation from 1913-1974.

Gallery

See also

 Finnish Railway Museum
 History of rail transport in Finland
 Jokioinen Museum Railway
 List of Finnish locomotives
 VR Class Pr1
 VR Class Hr1
 VR Class Tk3
 VR Group

References

 
 
 
  Official website

External links
Finnish Railway Museum
Steam Locomotives in Finland Including the Finnish Railway Museum

Vr1
Vr1
Railway locomotives introduced in 1913
Hanomag locomotives
0-6-0 locomotives
5 ft gauge locomotives